Luni Mawaran is a town in the Islamabad Capital Territory of Pakistan. It is located at 33° 26' 30N 73° 23' 50E with an altitude of 538 metres (1768 feet).

References 

Union councils of Islamabad Capital Territory